Pascal Atuma is a Canadian-Nigerian actor, screenwriter, film producer, director, and CEO/Chairman of TABIC Record Label (a label dedicated to the less privileged but talented in Africa). 
Pascal was born in Ikwuano Umuahia, Abia State, Nigeria. He attended Government College, Umuahia, and attended the University of Port Harcourt, Rivers State, Nigeria. He also attended KD Conservatory-College of Film & Dramatic Arts in Dallas, Texas, USA. He was also awarded a Certificate in Entrepreneurship Specialization from the University of Pennsylvania, in the United States.

As a director, he's helmed most of his movie productions. As an actor, he starred in several of his productions, as well as other projects including 'Sweet Revenge,(Winner 2018, Kevin Hart's  Laugh Out Loud, Just For Laughs “Eat my Shorts" Lions Gate Competition)." “Bloodlines”  “LAPD African Cops” “The Other Side of Love,” “My American Nurse” “Faithfulness” and "Secret Past," Among others.
Pascal's body of works includes blockbuster movies like “My American Nurse 1& 2, Hurricane in the Rose Garden” Only in America” Okoto the messenger” Who is the Man” , Accidental life, and Life In NY. Pascal is a multi-talented artiste and a veteran TV Presenter who produced and presented his 26 episodes self- signature reality program in 2005 -  titled “ One- World with Pascal Atuma” Pascal has discovered and influenced a generation of Nollywood actors and actresses of today.

He is also a theater director that has directed many world-class shows that include the Afro Australian Music & Movie Awards in Sydney Australia, South Sudanese Got Talent, Melbourne Australia, Oturkpo Got Talent, Benue State, Nigeria, etc., and also directed numerous live shows with notable African Music Superstars like Awilo Logomba, Davido, 2Face Idibia, Timomatic, etc.  
He is also the host of “The Pascal Atuma Show" and the popular YouTube talk show “The House of Commons”. Most recently he directed the first season (13 episodes) of communications giant Global Com's TV Series titled “Professor JohnBull”
 
In 2018, he directed and produced the first Canadian- Nigerian co-produced feature film titled “Clash”, set for release worldwide in 2019.

Filmography
Actor
2020: Clash
2019: Only You & Me (post-production) Phil
2018: Sweet Revenge (Short) Mr. Mandela
2018: Busted Life Clerk
2016: LAPD African Cops Officer Ghana
2014: Blood Lines Icon
2013: Hawa (Short) (completed) Jonas
2012: The Mechanic-Who Is the Man Kumasi
2011: Okoto the Messenger 
2011: Secret Past
2010: My American Nurse 2
2009: Hurricane in the Rose Garden
2008: Through the Glass (with Stephanie Okereke)
2006: My American Nurse
2005: Only in America
2004: Accidental Life
2004: In His Kiss
2004: Life in New York
Producer
2020 Clash
2018 Sweet Revenge (Short) (producer) 
2016 LAPD African Cops (executive producer) / (producer) 
2014 Blood Lines (producer) 
2012 The Mechanic-Who Is the Man (executive producer) / (producer) 
2011 Okoto the Messenger (producer) 
2010 My American Nurse 2 (producer) 
2009 Hurricane in the Rose Garden (Video) (producer) 
2006 My American Nurse (executive producer) / (producer) 
2005 Only in America (producer)
Writer /Screen Play (9 credits)
2020 Clash
2018 Sweet Revenge (Short) 
2016 LAPD African Cops 
2014 Blood Lines 
2012 The Mechanic-Who Is the Man 
2011 Okoto the Messenger 
2010 My American Nurse 2 (screenplay & story) 
2009 Hurricane in the Rose Garden (Video) 
2006 My American Nurse 
2005 Only in America
Director (8 credits)
2020 Clash
2018 Sweet Revenge (Short) 
2017: Gone To America
2016 LAPD African Cops 
2014 Blood Lines 
2012 The Mechanic-Who Is the Man 
2011 Okoto the Messenger 
2010 My American Nurse 2 
2006 My American Nurse
Casting department (1 credit)
2011 Okoto the Messenger (casting)
Self (1 credit)
2018 Mister Tachyon (TV Series documentary) Dr. Tachyon.

Awards and honours
2018 Winner -Kevin Hart's Laugh Out Loud - Just for Laughs, "Eat My Shorts" Lion's Gate Competition, Montreal, Canada
2015 Best Film LAPD African Cops. Golden Icons Academy Movie Awards (GIAMA) in Houston, Texas. USA
2015 Best Actor. LAPD African Cops.  Golden Icons Academy Movie Awards (GIAMA) in Houston, Texas. USA
2014 BEST FILM DIRECTOR/ PRODUCER (DIASPORA) – PASCAL ATUMA . Afro Australian Music and Movie Award (AAMMA)
2013 Life time - Movie Achievement Award, Los-Angeles Nollywood Film Award (LANFA), Los Angeles, California
2012 Best Film Diaspora - The Mechanic (who's the man)Nigerian Promoters Association Awards (NPA, Atlanta, Georgia
2012 Best Male Actor - Diaspora (Viewer's choice)Golden Icons Academy Movie Awards (GIAMA) in Houston, Texas. USA
2012 Best Actor of the Year Nigerian Promoters Association Awards (NPA), Atlanta, Georgia, USA
2012 Best Movie Director of the Year, Nigerian Promoters Association Awards (NPA), Atlanta, Georgia, USA
2011 Best African Comedic Actor. Afro Australian Music and Movie Award (AAMMA), Sydney, Australia

See also
 List of Nigerian film producers

References

External links
 

1972 births
Living people
Male actors from Umuahia
Nigerian male film actors
Nigerian film directors
Nigerian screenwriters
Nigerian film producers
Igbo male actors
21st-century Nigerian male actors
Nigerian television presenters
Nigerian male television actors
Male actors from Abia State
University of Port Harcourt alumni